The Melbourne Sandbelt is a region in southeastern Melbourne, Australia, known for its sandy soil. Several significant golf courses are located in the region.

Location
The Melbourne Sandbelt is a rough triangle extending from Brighton south along the coast of Port Phillip Bay to Frankston and to the east as far as Heatherton, Clayton and Oakleigh.

Geology

Much of Melbourne's eastern suburbs are covered by heavy clay subsoil. Around 20 million years ago, lower lying areas were flooded, which deposited sandstone material, now known as the Brighton Group. The Sandbelt suburbs are built on remnant sand dunes from this time. The sand can reach a depth of 80 metres in some places. Further east and north, the clay remains, and this region is sometimes referred to as the Clay Belt by contrast to the Sandbelt.

Flora of the Sandbelt
The surface soils across the Sandbelt today are the result of the geology, topography, marine currents, climate and vegetation. The present-day coastal dune systems were formed in the last 6000 years by wave action depositing sand and silts from the bay onto its beaches. The most prominent dune systems are between Mordialloc and Frankston. This formed a coastal barrier, behind which occurs the Carrum Carrum Swamp in a section of the Port-Phillip sunkland.

Currently, the Sandbelt region has been impacted by extensive suburb growth, and there are few locations where the remnant vegetation has been preserved. Revegetation efforts by local councils are ongoing, and seek to return the land back to the remnant vegetation (prior to European settlement). To help achieve this, various vegetation communities have been identified.

The following table presents the different vegetation communities of the Sandbelt, along with a list of associated species.

Sand mining
Sand mining has been conducted in the Sandbelt region since the 1880s. Several former sand mining sites have been used for landfill waste disposal once mining ceased.

Golf courses
Sandy soil is particularly suitable for golf courses. It is easy to place bunkers wherever a course designer chooses, without the need to carry in sand from another location, and it is easy to ensure appropriate drainage. A feature of several Melbourne Sandbelt courses is that bunkers are cut right on the edge of a green, which is not possible in other courses with different soil types.

There are several major championship courses in the Melbourne Sandbelt which are regularly listed among the world's best. Notable courses include Royal Melbourne Golf Club, Victoria Golf Club, Kingston Heath Golf Club, Huntingdale Golf Club, and Metropolitan Golf Club. Royal Melbourne and Kingston Heath both feature in the Golf Digest top 20 courses in the world.

Major championship courses
Commonwealth Golf Club, Oakleigh South
Huntingdale Golf Club, Oakleigh South
Kingston Heath, Heatherton
Metropolitan Golf Club, Oakleigh South
Royal Melbourne Golf Club, Black Rock
Victoria Golf Club, Cheltenham
Yarra Yarra Golf Club, Bentleigh East

Private courses
Capital Golf Club, Heatherton
Cheltenham Golf Club, Cheltenham
Keysborough Golf Club, Keysborough
Long Island Country Club, Frankston North
Patterson River Golf Club, Bonbeach
Peninsula Kingswood Country Golf Club, Frankston
Rossdale Golf Club, Aspendale
Sandhurst Club, Skye
Southern Golf Club, Keysborough
Spring Valley Golf Club, Clayton South
Woodlands Golf Club, Mordialloc

Public courses
Amstel Park, Cranbourne
Brighton Golf Course Brighton, Victoria
Centenary Park, Frankston
Chelsea Public Golf Course, Edithvale
Sandringham Golf Course, Cheltenham and Black Rock
Spring Park Golf Course, Dingley Village

References

External links
Melbourne Sandbelt Golf Map
The Melbourne Sandbelt - Classic Golf - an association of major courses
Interview with Paul Daley and David Scaletti, authors of The Sandbelt – Melbourne’s Golfing Heaven .
Musician Lloyd Cole's account of playing the Sandbelt courses, which won the Australian Golf Writer's Best Feature of the Year Award in 2009.

Geography of Melbourne
Geology of Victoria (Australia)